The Shuttle of Life is a 1920 silent British drama film directed by D. J. Williams. The film is considered to be lost.

Plot
An actress poses as dead heiress, who then dies in burning building fighting blackmailing a detective.

Cast 
 C. Aubrey Smith as Reverend John Stone
 Evelyn Brent as Miriam Grey
 Jack Hobbs as Ray Sinclair
 Gladys Jennings as Audrey Bland
 Bert Darley as Tom
 Cecil Ward as Meeson
 Rachel de Solla as Mrs. Bland

References

External links 

1920 films
1920 drama films
British drama films
British silent feature films
British black-and-white films
Films directed by D. J. Williams
Lost British films
1920 lost films
Lost drama films
1920s British films
Silent drama films